Kerch was one of eight Fidonisy-class destroyers built for the Imperial Russian Navy during World War I. Completed in 1917, she played a minor role in the war as part of the Black Sea Fleet before the Russian Revolution began later that year. Her crew joined the Bolsheviks in December and the ship supported their efforts to assert control in the Crimea over the next several months. The ship sailed from Sevastopol as the Germans approached in April 1918, but was scuttled in Novorossiysk harbor the following month when the Germans demanded that she be handed over as per the terms of the Treaty of Brest-Litovsk. The Soviets attempted to refloat her in 1929, but the wreck broke apart while being lifted. Three years later they successfully salvaged her engine room and incorporated her steam turbines into a power station in Tuapse.

Design and description

Her crew numbered 136 men.

The ships mounted a main armament of four single 102 mm Pattern 1911 Obukhov guns. Unhappy with the reliability of the  anti-aircraft gun, the navy replaced them with a pair of  Hotchkiss guns which were installed after she was completed. Kerch was also fitted with four  M-1 machine guns. The destroyers mounted four triple  torpedo tube mounts amidships with a pair of reload torpedoes and could carry 80 M1908 naval mines. They were also fitted with a Barr and Stroud rangefinder and two  searchlights. Kerch was delivered without her gunnery and torpedo fire-control systems and they were installed after she was commissioned.

Construction and service 
The eight Fidonisy-class destroyers were ordered on 17 March 1915 at a cost of 2.2 million rubles each. All of them received names in honor of the victories of Admiral Fyodor Ushakov. Among these was Kerch, commemorating Ushakov's victory at the Battle of Kerch Strait in 1790. After being added to the Black Sea Fleet ship list on 2 July 1915, Kerch was laid down in the Russud Shipyard in Nikolayev on 29 October 1915. The ship was launched on 18 May 1916 and completed on 27 June 1917. She was assigned to the Third Division of Destroyers and escorted a minelaying mission in July. The navy ceased offensive operations against the Central Powers in early November in response to the Bolshevik Decree on Peace before a formal Armistice was signed the next month. Her crew joined the Bolsheviks the following month.
 
In January 1918 the ship supported Bolshevik efforts to consolidate their power in Yevpatoria and Feodosia, Crimea, and bombarded Romanian troops in the Danube estuary. The next month, Kerch participated in a punitive expedition against Novorossiysk to suppress anti-Bolshevik elements. On 29 April the ship sailed from Sevastopol to Novorossiysk to avoid being seized by advancing German forces. On 18 June, the ship scuttled the battleship Svobodnaya Rossiya and her sister ship  in Tsemes Bay with her torpedoes to avoid turning them over to the Germans in accordance with the terms of the Treaty of Brest-Litovsk. The next day Kerch sailed to Tuapse and scuttled herself off the harbor entrance. On 22 November 1922 the Soviet salvage organization EPRON attempted to raise her wreck, but it broke into pieces while being lifted. They raised her engine rooms in December 1932 and the repaired turbines were installed in the Tuapse power plant.

References

Bibliography

Further reading
 
 

Fidonisy-class destroyers
Ships built at the Black Sea Shipyard
1916 ships